Prasophyllum caudiculum, commonly known as the Guyra leek orchid, is a species of orchid endemic to a small area of northern New South Wales. It has a single tubular, bright green leaf and up to thirty five greenish to reddish-brown flowers crowded along an erect flowering stem. It grows in grassy places near Guyra.

Description
Between ten and thirty five flowers are crowded along the flowering spike. The flowers are greenish-brown to reddish-brown. As with others in the genus, the flowers are inverted so that the labellum is above the column rather than below it. The edge of the labellum flares widely and is wavy near its tip. There is a broad, green, fleshy, channelled callus in the centre of the labellum. Flowering occurs from October to December.

Taxonomy and naming
Prasophyllum caudiculum was first formally described in 2000 by David Jones from a specimen collected near Guyra and the description was published in The Orchadian. The specific epithet (caudiculum) is derived from Latin meaning "a little tail", referring to the narrow labellum mid-lobe.

Distribution and habitat
This leek orchid grows with grasses and herbs on the New England Tableland.

References

Gallery

External links 
 
 

caudiculum
Orchids of New South Wales
Endemic orchids of Australia
Plants described in 2000